Alfred Leonard Kristian Vågnes (13 April 1880  –  12 October 1970) was a Norwegian politician for the Labour Party and later the Communist Party.

He was born in Tromsøysund.

Originally active in the Labour Party, Vågnes served in the position of deputy representative to the Parliament during the term 1922–1924. He was a member of the national party board from 1920 to 1923, and represented the party at the Third Comintern Congress in 1921. In 1923 the Labour Party left Comintern, and in 1924 Vågnes joined the Communist Party.

He was elected to the Norwegian Parliament from Finnmark in 1945, but was not re-elected in 1949 as the Communist Party dropped from 11 to 0 seats in Parliament.

Vågnes held various positions in Kjelvik municipality council from 1916 to 1940, serving as deputy mayor briefly in 1931 and mayor in 1931–1934.

References

1880 births
1970 deaths
Politicians from Tromsø
Labour Party (Norway) politicians
Communist Party of Norway politicians
Members of the Storting
20th-century Norwegian politicians